Skania is a Cambrian fossil arthropod. The type species, S. fragillis, is known from the Burgess Shale of British Columbia, Canada. A second possible species "S." sundbergi is known from the Kaili Formation of China, but its placement within the genus has been questioned.

Description 
Specimens of S. fragillis range in length from 7.5 mm to 13.5 mm. The cordiform dorsal shield/carapace covers the entire body, with its midline having a raised keel. The shield curls around the front to form a doublure, with the posterior eddge of the doublure having a pair of lateral spines. A pair of spines is also present on the posterior of the dorsal shield. There are two sets of appendages, the first 5 pairs of appendages are elongate, somewhat curved and extend beyond the shield. In contrast, the trunk appendages are shorter and are less curved.

Specimens of "S." sundbergi are on average 7.92 mm in length. The midline keel is more strongly pronounced in "S." sundbergi. The spines present in S. fragillis are either more weakly developed or absent.

Taxonomy 
While previously enigmatic, it is now thought to be a marrellomorph, with both species, regardless of generic placement, belonging to Acercostraca. The resemblance with the Ediacaran organism Parvancorina, to which Skania had previously been suggested to be closely related as part of the proposed clade "Parvancorinomorpha", is superficial and they are probably not related.

References

External links 
 

Burgess Shale fossils
Cambrian arthropods
Marrellomorpha

Cambrian genus extinctions